The district of Nürtingen was a district (Landkreis) in Baden-Württemberg, which was dissolved in the course of the district reform on 1 January 1973.

Geography

Location
The district Nürtingen was in the middle of Baden-Württemberg.

History 
The territory of the district Nürtingen belonged already before 1800 mainly to Württemberg. Therefore, it existed before 1800, the Oberamt Nürtingen and Oberamt Kirchheim. In 1934 the Oberamt offices were renamed to counties and according to the law on the country classification of 24 April 1938, the district Kirchheim was united on 1 October 1938 with the district Nürtingen. For county seat Nürtingen was determined. In 1945, the county Nürtingen came to the newly formed country Württemberg-Baden, which opened in 1952 in the state Baden-Württemberg.
With effect from 1 January 1973 the district Nürtingen was dissolved. Its communities went almost entirely to the new district of Esslingen. The municipality Grafenberg however came to the district of Reutlingen.

Towns and municipalities

References

Former districts of Baden-Württemberg
1972 disestablishments in West Germany